Dianthus monspessulanus, the fringed pink, is a herbaceous perennial plant of the genus Dianthus of the family Caryophyllaceae. The genus name Dianthus derives from the Greek words for divine ("dios") and flower ("anthos"), while the species name monspessulanus means "from Montpellier".

Description

Dianthus monspessulanus is a hemicryptophyte scapose plant reaching on average  of height. The stem is green, erect, glabrous and branched on the top, the leaves are opposite, simple, linear and sessile, more or less erect and flexuous, with a sheath embracing the stem. The flowers are hermaphrodite, single or gathered in scapes of 3–5 flowers, with 10 stamens. The flowering period extends from May through August. The fruits are capsules with a few seeds.

Distribution
This species is present in Albania, the former Yugoslavia, Italy, France, Switzerland, Austria, Spain and Portugal.

Habitat
It prefers rich and well drained soils in sunny places.

References

 Pignatti S. - Flora d'Italia – Edagricole – 1982. Vol. I, pag. 272
 Conti F., Abbate G., Alessandrini A., Blasi C. (a cura di), 2005 - An annotated checklist of the Italian vascular flora - Palombi Editori

External links
 Biolib

monspessulanus
Plants described in 1759
Taxa named by Carl Linnaeus